Kinice  is a village in the administrative district of Gmina Nowogródek Pomorski, within Myślibórz County, West Pomeranian Voivodeship, in north-western Poland.

In Kinice there is a Catholic church of Our Lady of Help to the Faithful, subordinate to the parish in nearby Nowogródek Pomorski.

Polish speedway rider, 2019 World Champion Bartosz Zmarzlik comes from Kinice.

References

Kinice